The name Red Cross generally refers to the humanitarian movement, the International Red Cross and Red Crescent Movement, which is composed of:

 International Committee of the Red Cross
 International Federation of Red Cross and Red Crescent Societies
 List of Red Cross and Red Crescent Societies, national societies that belong to the Movement
 American Red Cross, the national society in the United States, founded in 1881
 British Red Cross, the national society in the United Kingdom, founded in 1870
 Emblems of the International Red Cross and Red Crescent Movement

The name may also refer to:

 Anarchist Black Cross, which was originally called the "Anarchist Red Cross"
 Red Cross (album), the last album by John Fahey
 Red Cross (band), an American rock band which changed its name to Redd Kross
 Red Cross (EP), the debut release by the American rock band Redd Kross.
 Royal Red Cross, a military decoration awarded in the United Kingdom for exceptional services in military nursing
 Red Cross (order), either of two different masonic orders whose full names are thus abbreviated
 Red Cross (play), a 1966 play by Sam Shepard
 Red Cross, North Carolina
 Crveni Krst concentration camp, sometimes translated as Red Cross camp
 Red Cross Medal (Prussia), awarded for services to the sick
 Decoration for Services to the Red Cross, an award of the Austro-Hungarian Empire
 Redcross, Ireland

See also

 Blue Cross (disambiguation)
 Bronze Cross (disambiguation)
 Gold Cross (disambiguation)
 Green Cross (disambiguation)
 Silver Cross (disambiguation)
 White Cross (disambiguation)
 Yellow Cross (disambiguation)
 Crveni Krst (disambiguation) ("Red Cross")